The Graduate School of Media Communication and Performing Arts (or ALMED) is an Italian educational institution of Università Cattolica del Sacro Cuore.

History
Mario Apollonio was the founder of the School of Journalism and Audiovisual Media in Bergamo in 1961. Later, the school moved to Milan where it focused on teaching and research at the Università Cattolica del Sacro Cuore.  It was renamed as the School of Specialization in Communications and offers degrees in studies of Journalism, Advertising and Entertainment. It was again renamed to the School of Specialization in Analysis and Communication Management in 1998. In 2002, it joined the system of the Postgraduate School's Cattolica with its current name.

Courses
The school offers master's degrees in:
Musical communication
Communication and marketing of film
Communications, digital marketing and interactive advertising
Master of Cultural Events (MEC): Design and planning of cultural events, art, cinema, entertainment
Art Events: Planning of art, culture and design for cities, businesses and territories (organized in collaboration with the Polytechnic of Milan)
The enterprise culture: management, finance, communication culture of the area
Audiovisual production for film and digital media
FareTV: management, development, communication
Media relations and corporate communications

Projects
Magzine is the online newspaper written by the School of Journalism since 2002. Forty journalists work in the newsroom.

References

External links
  

Università Cattolica del Sacro Cuore
Graduate schools in Italy
Universities and colleges in Milan
Media studies
Educational institutions established in 2002
2002 establishments in Italy